Merlin is a two-part 1998 television miniseries that originally aired on NBC. It retells the legend of King Arthur from the perspective of the wizard Merlin.

Sam Neill starred in the title role in a story that covers not only the rise and fall of Camelot but also the phase in the legendary history of Britain that precedes it.

The film deviates from more traditional versions of the legend, notably by including new characters such as Queen Mab and by keeping Merlin through the whole reign of King Arthur over Britain (whereas in older versions, Merlin left earlier in the king's reign). 

The film was followed by a sequel in 2006, Merlin's Apprentice, which was loosely connected with traditional Arthurian legend.

Plot 
Merlin, an elderly man telling his life story, describes a Britain faced with invasions and tyrant kings increasingly cruel to the people. Fairy Queen Mab seeks to reclaim her power by drawing people back to worship the "Old Ways." To do so, she creates a wizard named Merlin, whom she intends to champion her crusade. Merlin's mother dies giving birth to him, and he is raised by his guardian, Ambrosia.

Years later, a teenage Merlin recounts to Ambrosia how he rescued a nobleman's daughter, Nimue, from drowning by magically growing a branch. Ambrosia tells him of his past, and he is sent to Mab to begin training with Frik, Mab's gnome servant; however, Merlin has little interest in helping Mab's crusade to restore the Old Ways, angering her. Merlin discovers from the Lady of the Lake, Mab's sister, that Mab let his birth mother die and that Ambrosia is ill. Mab reaches Ambrosia's home before Merlin, but when Ambrosia refuses to convince Merlin to return to Mab, Mab lashes out, mortally injuring Ambrosia. Merlin tries to attack Mab but can't defeat her; she coldly dismisses the deaths of his mother and Ambrosia as "casualties of war" and vows that Merlin will help her. Merlin makes a blood oath to use his powers only to defeat Mab.

Many years pass. The tyrant King Vortigern is angered that his new castle keeps collapsing. Mab convinces Vortigern his castle will only stand if Merlin's blood is mixed with the mortar. Vortigern orders Merlin killed but relents when Merlin tells Vortigern of his vision: a crimson dragon representing Uther Pendragon defeating the white dragon that represents Vortigern. Mab tells the king that he can vanquish Uther by sacrificing Nimue to a dragon in the hope that Merlin will break his vow not to use magic. Merlin uses magic to save Nimue, and she is sent to Avalon to recover from her burns. Merlin asks the Lady of the Lake for help, and she gives him the magical sword Excalibur.

Merlin warns Uther of Vortigern's intention to attack him under cover of winter. Uther heeds Merlin's warning, and Merlin uses Excalibur to defeat Vortigern during battle, giving Excalibur to Uther afterward.

Uther becomes obsessed with Igraine, the wife of Gorlois, Lord of Cornwall. Seeing his emerging madness, Merlin tricks Uther out of Excalibur and plunges it into the Rock of Ages, who promises to keep it until a good man can withdraw it. Uther's mind is plagued by madness and lust for Igraine, and Britain slides back into civil war. Merlin strikes a deal with Uther to let him bed Igraine in exchange for guardianship of the son born from the union and for Gorlois and his men to be spared. Merlin transforms Uther's appearance into that of Gorlois, fooling everyone in Tintagel Castle except for Igraine's young daughter, Morgan le Fay. After bedding Igraine, Uther has Gorlois and his men slaughtered, deliberately going back on his word to Merlin.

While Igraine is in labor, at Mab's behest, Frik convinces Morgan to place a black stone beneath the baby's sheets in his crib. Igraine gives birth to Arthur. Mab then confronts Merlin, proclaiming Arthur to be damned, but Merlin vows to raise him in the ways of good and hopes Arthur will help bring about her demise.

Merlin tutors Arthur. Uther sinks further into madness and commits suicide, leaving the kingdom in turmoil. The noblemen in the kingdom try to take Excalibur from the Rock of Ages, but none can until Merlin presents Arthur, who is allowed to take the sword.

After initial hostility, the nobles unite behind Arthur as their rightful king. Merlin leaves, thinking the kingdom is finally at peace. Mab, however, instructs Frik to seek out Morgan (Helena Bonham Carter) and poison her mind by making her beautiful and having her seduce Arthur. He is unaware of their half-sibling relationship, and Merlin races back to Camelot to confront Arthur. Morgan gives birth to Mordred, who, conceived through incest, is born evil. Mab helps raise Mordred to become Arthur's downfall. Arthur starts construction of his castle of Camelot and marries Guinevere.

Arthur decides to take his knights on a quest for the Holy Grail, he holds a tournament to crown a champion who will defend and complete Camelot in his absence. The Lady of the Lake vows to guide Merlin to a man worthy of being Camelot's guardian. Merlin meets a boy, Galahad, and his parents, Lancelot, a skilled rider and swordsman, and Elaine of Astolat. Merlin brings Lancelot to Camelot, where he wins the tournament.

In Arthur's absence, Guinevere and Lancelot embark on a love affair. Mab makes sure Elaine sees his betrayal, and she is found dead at the shores of Camelot not long after. Lancelot flees Camelot in his guilt and shame. Arthur and his knights return, their quest for the Grail a failure.

Mordred introduces himself as Arthur's son and heir and reveals Guinevere's betrayal to all. Arthur is forced to condemn her to be burned at the stake for treason, but he relents and has Merlin save her before she is harmed, causing him to lose respect among the younger nobles. Lancelot rides back to Camelot to save Guinevere, and they ride away into exile.

Mordred raises an army among those dissatisfied with Arthur and Merlin. Meanwhile, Frik and Morgan have fallen in love. When Morgan refuses to allow Mab to use Mordred further, Mab kills her. Frik vows revenge on Mab but is left powerless when she takes away his magic.

Mab creates an idyllic wilderness home for Nimue and asks her to persuade Merlin to stay with her, hoping to stop him from intervening in the coming battle. Wanting to be with him, Nimue agrees and sends for Merlin.

The armies of Mordred and Arthur begin the Battle of Camlann, where many on both sides are slain. Arthur defeats Mordred and kills him, but Mordred deals Arthur a fatal blow. Sensing his protégé is dying, Merlin leaves Nimue to go to Arthur, but Mab's creation seals itself behind him, parting Merlin from Nimue forever. On the battlefield, Mab cannot save Mordred, and Arthur lives long enough to tell Merlin to return Excalibur to where it was found. Merlin gives back the sword to the Lady of the Lake. She tells Merlin she is slowly dying as the Old Ways are forgotten. Merlin accuses her of lying to him about the guardian of Camelot, but she explains that it was Galahad who was the true guardian and could have averted all this, though she assures Merlin that Arthur's death is not his fault. Merlin encounters Frik among the survivors of Arthur's army, who warns him that although Mab is significantly weakened, she is still dangerous.

Merlin confronts Mab at Camelot, but the ensuing magical duel ends in a stalemate. Mab sneers that she is invulnerable to conventional means of destruction, but Merlin responds that she will be defeated when she is forgotten. Mab slowly fades into nothing as Merlin, Frik, and the entire court of Camelot turn their backs on her and walk away.

Merlin is again shown back in the present, finishing his story. Frik reminds Merlin that he remembers things differently; Merlin admits that what Frik said is true however he could not tell that story to his listeners. Frik leads Merlin to  Merlin's aged magic horse, who Frik says will take him to Nimue. Frik explains that sometime after Mab disappeared, the spells she had cast lost their effectiveness, and Nimue was set free. Merlin finds the elderly Nimue at Ambrosia's old forest home. He manages one last act of magic to restore them both to youth so they can live out their lives together.

Cast 

 Sam Neill as Merlin
 Daniel Brocklebank as teenage Merlin
 Miranda Richardson as Queen Mab and The Lady of The Lake (sisters)
 Isabella Rossellini as Nimue
 Agnieszka Kozon as teenage Nimue
 Martin Short as Frik
 Paul Curran as Arthur
 Helena Bonham Carter as Morgan le Fay
 Alice Hamilton as young Morgan le Fay
 Rutger Hauer as King Vortigern
 James Earl Jones as the Rock of Ages
 John Gielgud as King Constant
 Billie Whitelaw as Ambrosia
 Lena Headey as Guinevere
 Jason Done as Mordred
 Rachel De Thame as Igraine
 Mark Jax as Uther
 Jeremy Sheffield as Lancelot
 Sebastian Roché as Gawain
 John McEnery as Lord Ardente
 Roger Ashton-Griffiths as Sir Boris
 Nicholas Clay as Lord Leo
 Robert Addie as Sir Gilbert
 Keith Baxter as Sir Hector
 Nickolas Grace as Sir Egbert
 John Turner as Lord Lot
 Peter Woodthorpe as Soothsayer

Production 
The film was produced by Dyson Lovell and directed by Steve Barron. The story is by Edward Khmara, with the teleplay written by David Stevens and Peter Barnes. Illustrator Alan Lee served as the film's conceptual designer.

Despite heavy fantasy elements, the production is partly historically accurate, keeping with the probable origins of the Arthurian legend in Sub-Roman Britain. The costumes and props used in the film include Dark Age or Early Medieval Celtic and Roman-style weapons and armor (such as Iron Age swords, mail, scale, and leather). In contrast, other Arthurian films like Excalibur, Knights of the Round Table, and First Knight used High Medieval or Late Medieval-style weapons and armour (such as  longswords and full suits of plate). However, some anachronisms are present, like the use of the terms "knight" and "Sir" and the presence of Roman lorica segmentata armour years after it was discontinued. During the conflict between Vortigern and Uther, Uther is said to be invading from Normandy, despite the film taking place long before the age of the Vikings and thus of the Norman colonization, which gave Normandy its name. 

Nicholas Clay, who plays Guinevere's father, Lord Leo, and Robert Addie, who plays Sir Gilbert, both appeared in John Boorman's 1981 film Excalibur as (respectively) Lancelot and Mordred. Paul Curran, who played the adult King Arthur, played Kay alongside Jason Connery as Merlin in Merlin: The Quest Begins, an unrelated television film released the same year.

Reception
The original television broadcast in the United States achieved record audiences of an estimated 70 million, "ratings that could only be labeled magical," as The New York Times stated.

Accolades

Sequel 

Hallmark Entertainment filmed a subsequent miniseries in Vancouver, entitled Merlin's Apprentice, with Neill and Richardson returning, although Richardson played a somewhat different role. The miniseries was broadcast in 2006 on Hallmark Channel.

References

External links 
 

1998 American television series debuts
1998 American television series endings
1990s American television miniseries
Television series based on Arthurian legend
American sword and sorcery films
1998 films
1998 fantasy films
Films set in England
Sonar Entertainment miniseries
Television series produced at Pinewood Studios
Works based on Merlin
Films directed by Steve Barron
Television about magic
Witchcraft in television
Wizards in television
1990s American films